Miriam Elizabeth "Mimi" Rocah (born July 28, 1970) is an American attorney currently serving as District Attorney for Westchester County, New York. In 2020, Rocah defeated incumbent Democrat Anthony Scarpino in a primary challenge and went on to win in the General election.

Since taking office, Rocah has been particularly vocal in combating public corruption, governmental misconduct, substance abuse, and gun violence. Rocah has also promised to pursue criminal justice reform in Westchester County.

Education and early career 
Rocah graduated magna cum laude from Harvard University with a Bachelor of Arts degree in American history in 1992. She later obtained a Juris Doctor from New York University Law School, where she joined the Order of the Coif honors society.

Rocah started her legal career as a clerk for United States Eastern District Judge John Gleeson and later, Chester J. Straub, United States Court of Appeals for the Second Circuit. She later look a position as a litigation associate at Cravath, Swaine & Moore law firm.

In February 2001, Rocah became an Assistant United States Attorney for the Southern District of New York under U.S. Attorney Mary Jo White. From 2012 to 2017, Rocah led the Justice Department's division for Westchester County after being promoted by U.S. Attorney Preet Bharara. In 2016, Rocah received the 2016 Women In Federal Law Enforcement Leadership Award from the Department of Justice. Rocah worked as an Assistant U.S. Attorney for the Southern District of New York for over sixteen years, leaving in 2017.

Rocah was also a Distinguished Fellow in Criminal Justice and professor at the Elisabeth Haub School of Law at Pace University.

Rocah was also a legal analyst for both MSNBC and NBC News, where she frequently criticized former President Donald Trump. She made her campaign announcement for Westchester County District Attorney on a segment for the show Morning Joe on MSNBC News.

Political career 
In December 2019, Rocah announced she would launch a primary challenge against incumbent Westchester County District Attorney Anthony Scarpino, a fellow Democrat. She won the primary election and was endorsed by Scarpino against Republican candidate Bruce Bendish.

Six weeks before the General election was held, Bendish suspended his campaign for district attorney citing 'certain realities' in the race, clearing the way for Rocah to win the election. Rocah won the 2020 election for Westchester County District Attorney and was sworn in by her former employer, Preet Bharara, in January 2021.

Since taking office, Rocah has launched numerous campaigns and policies aimed at combating government impunity and criminal justice reform. In July 2021, Rocah announced her office would dismiss all open cannabis possession cases and limited their prosecution going forward. She also garnered national press after requesting evidence on New York State Governor Andrew Cuomo, following a state attorney general's report indicating he committed multiple acts of sexual harassment.

Personal life 
Rocah lives in Scarsdale, New York with her husband David Brian Anders, an attorney and partner at Wachtell, Lipton, Rosen & Katz, and their two children. She is Jewish.

Electoral history

References

1970 births
Living people
American lawyers
21st-century American lawyers
21st-century American politicians
Westchester County District Attorneys
Harvard University alumni
New York University School of Law alumni
New York (state) lawyers
New York (state) Democrats
Working Families Party politicians